The Nied is a river in Lorraine, France, and Saarland, Germany. It is a left tributary of the Saar. It is formed where two streams converge: the Nied allemande ("German Nied") and the Nied française ("French Nied"), which join in Condé-Northen.

Another town on the "Nied française" is Pange. Another town on the Nied allemande is Faulquemont.

It flows through Bouzonville, and joins the Saar in Rehlingen-Siersburg.

See also
List of rivers of Saarland
List of rivers of France

References

Rivers of Saarland
Rivers of France
International rivers of Europe
Rivers of Moselle (department)
Rivers of Grand Est
Rivers of Germany